Paralophia is a genus of orchids endemic to Madagascar. It contains two known species:

Paralophia epiphytica (P.J.Cribb, Du Puy & Bosser) P.J.Cribb, Bot. Mag. 22: 50 (2005).
Paralophia palmicola (H.Perrier) P.J.Cribb, Bot. Mag. 22: 51 (2005).

References

Eulophiinae
Eulophiinae genera
Orchids of Madagascar